Events in the year 1923 in Turkey.

Parliament
 2nd Parliament of Turkey

Incumbents
Mustafa Kemal Atatürk, President, 29 October 1923 – 10 November 1938
İsmet İnönü, Prime Minister, 1 November 1923 – 22 November 1924

Events

July
The Turkish War of Independence was settled with the Treaty of Lausanne, signed on 24 July
Turkish Republic was proclaimed on 29 October, abolishing the Ottoman sultanate
Letter from Agha Khan III to İsmet İnönü about the future of the Caliphate was sent on 24 November

Deaths
15 January – Zübeyde Hanım, 66, Mustafa Kemal Atatürk's mother.

Births
Refik Arslan, founder of Refik Restaurant (died 2011).

References

 
1920s in Turkey
Years of the 20th century in Turkey
Turkey
Turkey
Turkey